Magnolia, now known as Wavering Place also previously known as the Francis Tucker Hopkins House, is a historic plantation house located near Gadsden, Richland County, South Carolina. It was built about 1855, and is a two-story, Greek Revival style frame building with a full stuccoed brick basement and weatherboard siding.  The front facade features a portico with columns rest on tall stuccoed pedestals.  Also on the property are a brick kitchen/office, a frame smokehouse and two one-story frame slave houses.

It was added to the National Register of Historic Places in 1986.

References

External links
Wavering Place web site

Plantation houses in South Carolina
Houses on the National Register of Historic Places in South Carolina
Greek Revival houses in South Carolina
Houses completed in 1855
Houses in Richland County, South Carolina
National Register of Historic Places in Richland County, South Carolina